Aiptasiidae is a family of sea anemones, comprising the following genera:

 Aiptasia Gosse, 1858
 Aiptasiogeton Schmidt, 1972
 Bartholomea Duchassaing de Fonbressin & Michelotti, 1864
 Bellactis
 Exaiptasia Grajales & Rodriguez, 2014
 Laviactis Grajales & Rodriguez, 2014
 Neoaiptasia Parulekar, 1969
 Paraiptasia England, 1992
 Paranthea Verrill, 1868
The name (e.g. Verrill) after the genus refers to the researcher that discovered it, and the year is the date of discovery.

References

External links

 
Metridioidea
Cnidarian families